Devin Britton (born March 17, 1991) is an American professional tennis player. He is a native of Brandon, Mississippi. He is currently an assistant coach for the Ole Miss Rebels men's tennis team.

Tennis career

Juniors
Britton's most notable ITF junior tournament win was in June 2008, when he captured the International Grass Courts Championships. Also, in the summer of 2008 at the U.S. Open Junior Championships, he advanced to the finals match – making him the first ever qualifying wildcard to make a final where he lost to Grigor Dimitrov.

As a junior Britton compiled a singles win–loss record of 54–36 (and 92-29 in doubles), reaching as high as No. 13 in the junior world combined rankings in July 2009.

Junior Slam results – Singles:

Australian Open: -
French Open: 1R (2009)
Wimbledon: SF (2009)
US Open: F (2008)

Junior Slam results – Doubles:

Australian Open: -
French Open: 3R (2009)
Wimbledon: QF (2009)
US Open: QF (2007)

College

NCAA Men's Singles Title
Britton, at the age of 18, won the 2009 NCAA Men's Tennis singles championship as a freshman. He is the first Ole Miss men's tennis player to ever win an NCAA men's singles championship.

Britton defeated Moritz Baumann of Wisconsin in the first round then beat Dominic Inglot of Virginia in the second round. In the third round, Britton sent Rice senior Bruno Rosa out of the tournament in straight sets, and then he beat Stanford’s Alex Clayton in the quarterfinals. To advance to the NCAA championship match, he defeated Blake Strode of Arkansas with a straight set win. To win the championship, Britton defeated Ohio State senior Steven Moneke, making him the first American-born player to win the NCAA singles title since Alex Kim of Stanford in 2000. The championship win also makes him the first freshman since 19-year-old Cecil Mamiit of USC in 1996 and the first non-seeded player since Luke Smith of UNLV in 1997. He is the youngest of the three freshmen to win the singles title, including John McEnroe, who was 19 when he won it for Stanford in 1978 – making him the youngest player ever to win the national championship.

Leaving college 
After only one semester in college, Britton announced on July 1, 2009, that he would not return to Mississippi but would instead turn professional and had already signed a contract with a sports agency, Octagon Worldwide. He received a wildcard into the 2009 U.S. Open where he played #1 seeded and ranked Roger Federer in the opening round. Federer won the match in straight sets.

Awards
 Britton was named the Southeast Region Rookie of the Year by the Intercollegiate Tennis Association.
 Britton is a two-time SEC Player of the Week for the 2008–2009 season.
 Britton earned All-SEC second team honors and made the SEC All-Freshman Team for the 2008–2009 season.

ATP career finals

Doubles: 3 (2–1)

Personal life

Britton began playing tennis when he was 4 years old. Britton was home-schooled starting in the seventh grade. Because he was traveling extensively for tennis, he completed his high school education through the Alpha Omega Online Academy.

Devin’s parents are Scott and Cindy Britton. He is the youngest of three children. He has two older sisters, Tara Chez (33) and Katie (29).

Devin trained at the IMG Academy/Bollettieri Tennis Academy in Bradenton, Florida where he was coached by Nick Bollettieri, David Amye and Gabe Jaramillo. At Ole Miss, he was coached by Billy Chadwick. His serve and volley style is rare among modern players.

References

External links
 
 2008 U.S. Open interview
 
 
 Devin Britton at TennisRecruiting.net as a Junior player

1991 births
Living people
American male tennis players
Ole Miss Rebels men's tennis players
Ole Miss Rebels men's tennis coaches
People from Brandon, Mississippi
Tennis people from Mississippi
American tennis coaches